Loyola Press is a publishing house based in Chicago, Illinois. It is a nonprofit apostolate of the Chicago-Detroit Province of the Society of Jesus. It has no connection with Loyola University Chicago.

It primarily publishes school books for the parochial school market. However, in 1997, the press did publish a bestseller: The Gift of Peace, the last testament of Cardinal Joseph Bernardin.

History of Loyola
Loyola University Press was founded in 1912 and became a separate non-profit in 1940 independent of any university. It changed its name to Loyola Press in 1995.

Imprints
Loyola Press publishes Chicago-related titles under the Wild Onion imprint, Jesuit studies titles under the Jesuit Way banner, and textbooks under the Loyola University Press imprint.

Notable authors
Loyola Press has published books by the following notable people:

John Dear, S.J.
James Martin, S.J.
John R. Powers
Richard Rohr, O.F.M.

See also

 List of English-language book publishing companies

References

External links
Loyola Press

Publishing companies established in 1912
Book publishing companies based in Illinois
Non-profit organizations based in Chicago
1912 establishments in Illinois